The 1985 NBA Draft took place on June 18, 1985. It was also the first NBA draft of the "lottery" era. It was also around this time where the league decreased the amount of rounds the draft spent, with the previous few years lasting up to 10 rounds total. A total of 162 players were selected over seven rounds by the league's 23 teams.

The New York Knicks were awarded the first overall pick by winning the first-ever NBA draft lottery, which was held in May of that year.  The Knicks used it on Georgetown's Patrick Ewing. In addition to Ewing, this draft also resulted in several Hall of Famers, including Karl Malone taken by the Utah Jazz at pick 13.

Draft selections

*Further compensation for draft choices previously traded away by Ted Stepien.

Notable post-second round picks
This list includes only players who appeared in at least one NBA game but were not selected in the first or second rounds of the 1985 NBA draft.

* Compensation for the Utah Jazz signing Billy Paultz
** Compensation for the Los Angeles Lakers signing Larry Spriggs
*** Compensation for the Atlanta Hawks signing Billy Paultz

Notable undrafted players
These players were not selected in the 1985 draft but played at least one game in the NBA.

Controversy

Some have argued that NBA Commissioner David Stern fixed the first overall pick to help his hometown team, the struggling New York Knicks. The lottery system used in 1985 involved a random drawing of seven envelopes from a hopper, with each of the then-seven non-playoff teams having an equal chance of obtaining the first pick. Inside each of the envelopes was the logo of a non-playoff team.

The team whose envelope was drawn first would get the first pick. The process was then repeated until the rest of the first seven lottery picks were determined. In the U.S., CBS had live coverage of Stern pulling the envelopes from the hopper (as opposed to NBA Draft lotteries today where the actual drawing is held behind closed doors before the results are revealed on TV).

There is speculation that the envelope containing the Knicks logo was frozen beforehand, enabling David Stern to recognize and select it.

According to another theory, some claim that when an accountant from Ernst & Whinney (the same firm used by Gulf + Western, then-owners of the Knicks) inserted the seven envelopes into the glass drum, some have claimed that he banged the fourth one against the side of the drum to create a creased corner, thereby making it easier for Stern to determine which envelope to choose: the envelope containing the Knicks logo. According to this theory, as the drum was being spun by NBA security director Jack Joyce, Stern was watching the envelopes closely. He then opened the drum, took a deep breath, reached in and selected the envelope with the bent corner and the Knicks logo. This has not been confirmed or corroborated by any official source, as most note that the spinning of the drum was far more forceful than any movement by Joyce, deliberate or otherwise.

Early entrants

College underclassmen
The following college basketball players successfully applied for early draft entrance.

  George Almones – G, Southwestern Louisiana (junior)
  Joe Atkinson – F, Oklahoma State (junior)
  Benoit Benjamin – C, Creighton (junior)
  Manute Bol – C, Bridgeport (freshman)
  Kenny Brown – G, Texas A&M (junior)
  Derrick Gervin – F, Texas–San Antonio (junior)
  Kenny Green – F, Wake Forest (junior)
  Karl Malone – F, Louisiana Tech (junior)
  Jerry Reynolds – F, LSU (junior)
  Reggie Roberts – G, Texas A&M (junior)
  Wayman Tisdale – F, Oklahoma (junior)
  Carl Wright – G, SMU (junior)

See also
 NBA draft conspiracy
 List of first overall NBA draft picks

References

External links

Draft
National Basketball Association draft
National Basketball Association controversies
NBA draft
NBA draft
1980s in Manhattan
Basketball in New York City
Sporting events in New York City
Sports in Manhattan
Madison Square Garden